Gideon Klein (6 December 1919 – c. January 1945) was a Czechoslovakian pianist, classical music composer, educator and organizer of cultural life at Theresienstadt concentration camp.

Life
Klein was born into a Moravian Jewish family in Přerov and, showing musical talent early, studied piano with Růžena Kurzová and Vilém Kurz, and composition with Alois Hába (in 1939–40). He was forced to abort his university studies in 1940 when the Nazis closed all institutions of higher learning following their occupation of Czechoslovakia in March 1939. Since compositions and performances by Jewish musicians were banned, his own works could not be performed, though he managed to perform as a concert pianist under several aliases for a time, e.g., under the pseudonym Karel Vranek. Despite those harsh circumstances Klein managed to continue composing. In 1940 he was offered a scholarship at the Royal Academy of Music in London, but by that time anti-Jewish legislation prevented his emigration.

In December 1941 he was deported by the Nazis to Terezín concentration camp, where along with Leoš Janáček's pupil Pavel Haas, Hans Krása, and Schoenberg's pupil Viktor Ullmann he became one of the major composers at that camp. He gave concerts in secret, but the camp became one of the few in which artistic activity was eventually permitted by Nazis on any scale, if only to deceive the broader public as to their real intentions. His works from these years include music for string quartet (similar in tone to Berg's opus 3 work), a string trio, and a piano sonata, among others. Moreover, Klein performed as solo pianist at approximately 15 recitals, and also participated in chamber music performances (member of piano trio, piano quartet).

Klein was deported to Auschwitz in October 1944 and then to Fürstengrube, a coal-mining labour camp,  in October 1944, less than two weeks after completing his string trio. He died under unclear circumstances during the liquidation of the Fürstengrube camp in January 1945. He had confided his manuscripts to Irma Semtska, his Theresienstadt girlfriend, before leaving, and they were turned over to his sister Eliska at the war's end.

His work was influenced by Alois Hába, Arnold Schoenberg, Alban Berg, and particularly Leoš Janáček. He used melody from Janáček's Zápisník zmizelého as a theme in his Divertimento (1940).

Klein died at age 25 on January 25,1945 in Fürstengrube, a subcamp of Auschwitz.

Recordings on Northeastern and on Koch International Classics, for example, have allowed modern listeners to evaluate the quality of his compositions of the 1940s.

Selected works
Four Movements for String Quartet (1936–1938), CHF 
Topol (The Poplar Tree), melodrama for narrator and piano (1938)
Duo for Violin and Viola in the Quarter-Tone System (1940)
Preludium for Solo Viola (1940) 
Divertimento for Eight Wind Instruments (1940) 
Three Songs for High Voice and Piano, Op. 1 (1940)
I. The Fountain (Johann Klaj)
II. In the Midst of Life (Friederich Hölderlin)
III. Darkness Descending (Johann Wolfgang Goethe), Czech translations by Erich A. Saudek 
String Quartet, Op. 2 (1941) 
Duo for Violin and Cello (1941; unfinished)
Male Choruses, arrangements of Czech and Russian folk-songs (1942)
Bachuri Le'an Tisa (Young Man, Where are you Going?), setting of Hebrew text for 3-part female choir (1942)
Madrigal for Two Sopranos, Alto, Tenor and Bass to words by François Villon, Czech translation by Otokar Fischer (1942)
The First Sin, for male voice choir on a Czech folk poem (1942)
Fantasy and Fugue for String Quartet (1942–1943)
Wiegenlied, arrangement of a Jewish lullaby, set in Hebrew (1943)
Piano Sonata (1943), PA 9' 
Madrigal for Two Sopranos, Alto, Tenor and Bass to words by Franz Holderlin, Czech translation by Erich A Saudek (1943)
Spruch (A Saying) for mixed choir (1944) 
Trio for Violin, Viola and Cello (1944)
Partita (Trio for Violin, Viola and Cello in arrangement for chamber orchestra by Vojtěch Saudek)

Remembrance

In Prague, German artist Gunter Demnig collocated two Stolpersteine für Gideon Klein and Ilona Kleinová.

There is a Klein Trio, playing his music

Notes

References
Slavický, Milan: Gideon Klein. A Fragment of Life and Work. Praha: Helvetica Tempora 1995.  (Czech version of the book )  
Kuna, Milan: Hudba vzdoru a naděje. Terezín 1941–1945. Praha: Editio Bärenreiter 2000. H 7822
Vysloužil, Jiří: Hudební slovník pro každého II. Vizovice: Lípa, 1998 
Gertsenzon, Galit: Gideon Klein's Songs Op. 1 for High Voice and Piano http://holocaustmusic.ort.org/places/theresienstadt/klein-gideon/gideon-kleins-songs-op-1-for-high-voice-and-piano/
Fligg, David: Dopis od Gideona. Praha: Nakladatelství P3K 2019. 
Fligg, David: (Re)Visiting the (Jewish) Archive of Gideon Klein - Terezin, 1941-1944, in Erik Levi and David Fanning (eds.) 'The Routledge Handbook to Music under German Occupation, 1938-1945.' Oxon: Routledge 2020. 
Fligg, David: Gideon Klein at 100: A festival and a new biography. Prague: Czech Music Quarterly 2020. 
Fligg, David. Don't forget about me: The Short Life of Gideon Klein, Composer and Pianist. Boydell & Brewer (2022). 
Dümling, Albrecht, ed., Torso eines Lebens Der Komponist und Pianist Gideon Klein (1919-1945), von Bockel Verlag, Neumünster, 2021

External links
Nadace Gideona Kleina - Gideon Klein Foundation
Music and the Holocaust - Gideon Klein
Page on Gideon Klein (Jewish Music & Theatre Online)
Gideon Klein - Czech Composer
Page on Gideon Klein
Comprehensive discography of Terezin Composers by Claude Torres
Czech Jewish Museum
Concert 7 Candles to commemorate Terezín composers Gideon Klein and Pavel Haas
Further reading and listening on Terezín: The Music 1941-44
Performance Sheds New Light on Life & Work of Gideon Klein (Prague Radio in English, Czech Radio)

1919 births
1945 deaths
20th-century classical composers
20th-century classical pianists
20th-century Czech male musicians
Czech classical composers
Czech classical pianists
Czech male classical composers
Jewish classical composers
Jewish classical pianists
Male classical pianists
Musicians from Přerov
Czech Jews who died in the Holocaust
Czech people who died in Auschwitz concentration camp
Czechoslovak civilians killed in World War II
Theresienstadt Ghetto prisoners
Czechoslovak musicians